Harry Larsson (17 December 1888 – 1 November 1976) was a Swedish wrestler. He competed in the featherweight event at the 1912 Summer Olympics.

References

External links
 

1888 births
1976 deaths
Olympic wrestlers of Sweden
Wrestlers at the 1912 Summer Olympics
Swedish male sport wrestlers
Sportspeople from Gothenburg